Outlaw is an American legal drama television series created by John Eisendrath that aired on NBC. The one-hour courtroom drama stars Jimmy Smits as a Supreme Court Justice, Cyrus Garza, who resigns from the bench and returns to private practice in an elite law firm where Claire Sax, love interest to Garza, is a powerful senior partner. As part of the deal, the firm has an ex–Supreme Court Justice on their staff of lawyers and Garza is allowed to pick his team and the cases he works.

The series premiered on Wednesday, September 15, 2010 (a day earlier in Canada), and began airing on Fridays beginning September 24. On October 11, 2010, NBC cancelled the series after one season before the series finale aired on November 13, 2010.

Development and production
The series was originally titled Rough Justice, and then briefly Garza. NBC green-lit the pilot, which was written by John Eisendrath, in late January 2010. In mid February, Terry George signed on to direct the pilot.

Jesse Bradford was the first actor cast in early March. Jimmy Smits was cast next to headline the drama. Carly Pope and David Ramsey came on board a few days later. Filming for the pilot took place in late March and April, with some exterior shots done in Philadelphia, Pennsylvania and neighboring Bensalem, Atlantic City, New Jersey, and in the Arlington, Virginia area.

NBC announced in mid-May 2010 that the network had picked up the pilot for the 2010–11 season.  The series was expected to be produced in Los Angeles.

On October 6, NBC announced it had placed production of the series on hiatus due to low ratings for the first three episodes.  The hiatus became permanent after ratings failed to improve for the October 8 broadcast. Eight of the planned thirteen episodes have been produced.

Four episodes had aired when NBC announced Outlaw cancellation.  The remaining four were burned off on Saturdays through November 13.

Cast and characters
Jimmy Smits as Cyrus Garza
David Ramsey as Al Druzinsky
Ellen Woglom as Mereta Stockman
Carly Pope as Lucinda Pearl
Jesse Bradford as Eddie Franks
Melora Hardin as Claire Sax (recurring)

Reception
As of September 15, 2010, Outlaw has an average score of 36/100 on Metacritic based on 23 reviews from television critics. Barry Garron of The Hollywood Reporter appreciated the potential of Outlaw though he called the premise preposterous and likened it to a fairy tale. John Doyle of The Globe and Mail said that Outlaw is "not the best advertisement for quality TV drama." Doyle concluded by saying the show is "for fans of melodramatic legal shows only."

In its first airing against CBS's new drama Blue Bloods, on September 24, 2010, Outlaw was watched by roughly 4.893 million viewers, while Blue Bloods was watched by 13.013 million.

Episodes 
The series premiered September 14, 2010 on Global in Canada and debuted in the U.S. on NBC on September 15, 2010. Though NBC moved Outlaw to Saturdays when they canceled the show Global continued to broadcast the remaining episodes on Fridays.

International broadcasts
: Will begin airing after November 28, 2010 on Seven Network at 9:30 p.m., and it has been confirmed the entire season will air during the summer non-ratings period.

Home releases 
On January 24, 2011, in conjunction with Amazon.com's manufactured-on-demand (MOD) program, a DVD of all eight episodes of the series was released. The cover art consists of the promotional poster, with a Universal logo and border around it.

See also
Supreme Court of the United States in fiction

References

External links

2010s American drama television series
2010 American television series debuts
2010 American television series endings
2010s American legal television series
English-language television shows
NBC original programming
Television series by Conaco
Television series by Universal Television
Television series created by John Eisendrath
Television shows set in Washington, D.C.